Tim Mayotte won in the final 4–6, 4–6, 6–3, 6–2, 6–4 against Scott Davis.

Seeds

Main draw

Finals

Top half

Section 1

Section 2

Section 3

Section 4

Bottom half

Section 5

Section 6

Section 7

Section 8

References
 1985 Lipton International Players Championships Draw

Men's Singles